There are various communities of Germans in the Czech Republic. After the Czech Republic joined the European Union in the 2004 enlargement and was incorporated into the Schengen Area, migration between the two countries became relatively unrestricted. Both countries share a land border of 815 kilometers (506 mi).

History

Statistics 
In the 2001 census, 39,106 Czech citizens, or around 0.4% of the Czech Republic's total population, declared German ethnicity. In 2011 the census methodology changed and it was newly possible to declare multiple ethnicities or none at all: 25% of the citizens chose the option of not declaring ethnicity. In this census 18,658 citizens declared German as their sole ethnicity, while another 6,563 in combination with another ethnicity. According to regional statistics the largest number of citizens with German ethnicity is 4,431 in Karlovy Vary Region (1.5% of total population in this region). On district level the largest share is in Sokolov District (2.3%) followed by Karlovy Vary District (1.2%), both in Karlovy Vary Region. Today's Germans in the Czech republic form a small minority, remaining after the expulsion of the Sudeten Germans who had formed a majority in several areas of Czechoslovakia.

Following municipalities had in 2011 share of German ethnicity population over 6%:
 Horská Kvilda/Innergefild (Klatovy District) - 9.72%
 Měděnec/Kupferberg (Chomutov District) - 9.49%
 Kryštofovy Hamry/Christophhammer (Chomutov District) - 8.64%
 Mikulov/Niklasberg (Teplice District) - 7.80%
 Tatrovice/Dotterwies (Sokolov District) - 7.74%
 Abertamy/Abertham (Karlovy Vary District) - 7.42%
 Horní Blatná/Bergstadt Platten (Karlovy Vary District) - 7.38%
 Pernink/Bärringen (Karlovy Vary District) - 6.37%
 Stříbrná/Silberbach (Sokolov District) - 6.22%
 Josefov/Josefsdorf (Sokolov District) - 6.14%
 Vejprty/Weipert (Chomutov District) - 6.07%

Government statistics also showed 21,478 German citizens living in the CR as of December 31, 2019, with largest number of these in Ústí nad Labem Region (7,525) and Prague (4,146).

Education

The Deutsche Schule Prag is a German international school in Prague.

Media
 Landeszeitung der Deutschen in Böhmen, Mähren und Schlesien
 Prager Zeitung

See also
 Sudeten Germans
 Expulsion of Germans from Czechoslovakia

References

Further reading
 

 
Ethnic groups in the Czech Republic

Czech people of Austrian descent
Czech Republic–Germany relations